, also known by , is a Japanese businessman and former racing driver. Matsushita is the first and only Japanese driver to win the Toyota Atlantic Championship (Pacific) in 1989 and also the first Japanese driver to race at the Indy 500. He is the grandson of Kōnosuke Matsushita, founder of Panasonic, and son of Masaharu Matsushita, who served as the second president of Panasonic for sixteen years beginning in 1961.

Early life
Matsushita was born in Nishinomiya, Hyōgo Prefecture, Japan, and graduated from Konan University. The grandson of the founder of Panasonic has been edgy from the start about the tag of a rich kid who can buy his own ride, he worked his way up from the bottom. He began racing Formula Fords, the Class A of auto racing, in 1987. The following year, teaming with Jim Downing in a Camel Lights car, he finished second in class at the 24 Hours of Daytona and third at the 12 Hours of Sebring. In 1989, Matsushita jumped into the Formula Atlantic series. By the end of 1989, Matsushita earned four victories and the Formula Atlantic series championship.

Racing career
Matsushita started his career racing motorcycles in his home country between 1977 and 1979, before making the switch to four wheels. Matsushita began to make his name known by winning 1989 Toyota Atlantic championship (Pacific division) with the largest point margin of all time. He then tried Formula Pacific in New Zealand and became the first Japanese driver to win the prestigious Lady Wigram Trophy Race.

He graduated to Champ Car in 1990, scoring one point in his debut season. He became the first Japanese driver to race in the Indianapolis 500.
In 1991, and followed that achievement with a top ten finish at Milwaukee. Matsushita missed the 1992 Indy 500 after suffering a broken leg during a practice crash. He was sidelined for several weeks and missed the next six events as well.

At the Phoenix race in 1994, Matsushita endured a horrific crash in which his car was cut in half by Jacques Villeneuve's car traveling at nearly full speed. He emerged from his destroyed car with only minor injuries. The same year, he earned his best career finish of 6th position at the Marlboro 500 at Michigan International Speedway. This result was made possible by an extraordinarily high rate of attrition that saw only 8 cars finish the race. Matsushita was 11 laps behind the leader at the drop of the checkered flag.

By the time he retired in 1998, Matsushita had started 117 Champ Car races for Dick Simon Racing, Walker Racing, Arciero/Wells Racing and Payton/Coyne. He holds the record for most starts in American Championship Car Racing history without scoring a Top 5.

In 2001, Matsushita competed in the Baja 1000 off-road race, in a Mitsubishi Montero.

Racing record

WCAR/SCCA Western Formula Atlantic Championship results

IMSA Camel Lights results

Toyota Atlantic Championship (pacific) results

Lady Wigram Trophy results

American open–wheel racing results

Indy Lights

CART

24 Hours of Le Mans results

Nickname
Matsushita earned the nickname "King Hiro" from Emerson Fittipaldi, who was complaining about Matsushita's reluctance to cede track position when getting lapped by the leaders. The nickname came about as a result of the voice-activated microphone ("vox") Roger Penske's team was using. Fittipaldi's epithet was said so quickly that the circuit cut off the first syllable of the first word he used. Fittipaldi, allegedly, had intended to say "Fucking Hiro!"

Business career
Away from the track, Matsushita owns Matsushita International Corp, a Real estate, Finance & Insurance Firm and Swift Engineering, an American engineering firm known for producing racing cars for a variety of open-wheel racing series, including Formula Ford, Formula Atlantic, the Champ Car World Series and Formula Nippon. He bought Swift Engineering in 1991. In 2018 Swift Engineering joint ventured with Kobe Institute of Computing called Swift Xi, located in Kobe, Japan. providing data, logistics, and operations of autonomous and robotic technologies.

Private life
Matsushita resides in San Clemente, California.

Awards
In 1998, Nov 2, Hiro Matsushita was awarded Champion Culbs during the CART Year End Banquet at the Century Plaza in Los Angeles, California.

Matsushita family tree

See also
 Konosuke Matsushita
 Panasonic
 Masaharu Matsushita
 Swift Engineering
 Swift Xi

References

External links
 DriverDatabase
 MOTORSPORT STATS
 NASCAR
   RacingSportsCars 

1961 births
Japanese racing drivers
Living people
Champ Car drivers
Indianapolis 500 drivers
Indy Lights drivers
Atlantic Championship drivers
Panasonic
Sportspeople from Kobe
24 Hours of Le Mans drivers
Japanese IndyCar Series drivers
Japanese businesspeople
Walker Racing drivers
Dale Coyne Racing drivers
David Price Racing drivers